sometimes stylized as the 5★Star Grand Prix is an annual single-elimination tournament promoted by the Japanese professional wrestling promotion World Wonder Ring Stardom. The event has been held since 2012 and aired domestically on Tokyo MX, Fighting TV Samurai and Nippon TV, and later as an internet pay-per-view on Stardom's streaming service Stardom World. It is considered to be the main annual competition promoted by Stardom, being preceded by the Stardom Cinderella Tournament which is the secondary competition.

Tournament history
The Stardom 5 Star Grand Prix is a professional wrestling tournament held each summer by Stardom. Similar to Bushiroad-owned male counterpart New Japan Pro-Wrestling with the G1 Climax tournament, it is currently held as a round-robin tournament with wrestlers split into two pools. The winner of each pool will compete in the final to decide the winner.

As is the case with G1 Climax, a win is two points and a draw is one point for each wrestler.

There have been a total of ten editions that gave ten different champions. Seven of the title challenges were unsuccessful while only three were successful. Io Shirai successfully defended the World of Stardom Championship against three different tournament winners while Mayu Iwatani scored the only two defeats, dropping the same title.

In 2021, Stardom introduced the World of Stardom challenge rights certificate, in which the winner of 5 Star Grand Prix receives a contract for a future World of Stardom Championship match. Like NJPW's Tokyo Dome IWGP Heavyweight Championship challenge rights certificate, the contract is kept in a briefcase and can be defended until the title match.

List of winners

Record

Events
There have been a total of ten distinctive events. They usually spread across one or two months.

Notes

References

External links
Page Stardom World

World Wonder Ring Stardom shows
Women's professional wrestling shows
Women's professional wrestling tournaments